Paralithodes is a genus of North Pacific king crabs.

Species 

The genus contains the following species:

References

External links

King crabs
Decapod genera
Taxa named by Johann Friedrich von Brandt